The Society for the Encouragement of Arts, Manufactures and Commerce, founded in 1754, was the precursor of The Royal Society for the Encouragement of Arts, Manufactures and Commerce now more usually known as the RSA. The original Society gained the Royal prefix in the Edwardian era, when the Prince of Wales was its President. Its primary aim was to stimulate industry through the awarding of prizes.

History

In 1753, William Shipley – a little-known drawing master in Northampton – had the idea of stimulating industry by means of prizes funded by public-spirited people. Through mutual friends in London he was introduced to the Rev. Dr Stephen Hales, FRS, a distinguished scientist. Hales liked the idea and asked Shipley to put his proposals in writing while Hales contacted two important colleagues, Viscount Folkestone and Lord Romney, to seek their assistance.

Shipley produced two leaflets: “Proposals for raising by subscription a fund to be distributed in Premiums for the promoting of improvements in the liberal arts and sciences, manufactures, etc.” and “A scheme for putting the Proposals in execution”. These were privately circulated in London before Shipley moved to live there. He visited Lord Romney and was assured of his and Folkestone’s support. After months of canvassing Shipley called the first meeting, which was held at Rawthmell’s Coffee House, at 25 Henrietta Street, Covent Garden on 22 March 1754.

The name “Society for the Encouragement of Arts, Manufactures and Commerce” was adopted, but this rather cumbersome title was fairly soon abbreviated to "The Society of Arts". The organisation grew in its first few years from the original 11 members to about 3,000; ladies became members quite early on, as Shipley had wished. Viscount Folkestone was the first President (1755-1761) and Lord Romney the second (1761-1793). Samuel More was the society's Secretary from 1768 to his death in 1799.

An American member in London, Benjamin Franklin, came to view the Society as counter to the interests of America writing, " What you call Bounties...are nothing more than Inducements offered us, to induce us to leave Employments that are more profitable and engage in such as would be less...to quit a Business profitable to ourselves and engage in one as shall be profitable to you".

For the first two decades the Society used various premises, mostly in the Charing Cross area. Then, in 1772-74, the Adams brothers (Robert and James) built the present house for the Society, which has occupied it ever since. The property, at 6 John Adam Street, was completed on 24 April 1774; the Society was initially a tenant but bought the building in 1922.

One of the Society’s greatest achievements in the nineteenth century was its close involvement with establishing The Great Exhibition of 1851 in London. Prince Albert was president of the Society when, in 1845, he suggested to some of the members the idea of “forming in England great Periodical Exhibitions of the Products of Industry." Its subsequent organisation was handled by a Royal Commission, with extensive involvement of several members of the Society. During this period the Society received its Royal Charter.

In 1908 the Society became the Royal Society for the Encouragement of Arts, Manufactures and Commerce. Today it is more commonly known as the Royal Society of Arts or the RSA.

Early Meetings

The Society met 15 times in the period 22 March 1754 through 5 February 1755, with three members attending 10 or more times (Goodchild, Messiter and Shipley) and some only once or twice (Lawrence, Brander, Hales and the Bishop of Worcester)

Awards and Outcomes
From the very first meeting the Society took a practical approach to its mission. Premiums were offered for four specific purposes:

For the best quantity of cobalt produced in Great Britain
For raising and curing not less than 20 pounds of madder
For the best drawing by a child under 14 years of age
For the best drawing by a child between 14 and 17

The aim of the first two was to encourage domestic production of two very important raw materials, then being imported at great cost; and to make available cheap dyestuffs, to avoid having textiles dyed abroad. The third and fourth were to encourage a supply of draughtsmen, especially for creating designs in the textile industry.

The first premium list was a trial effort. Soon afterwards the members involved developed eight quite searching criteria for deciding how and to whom to award prizes. They ranged from deciding whether the proposal for an award had more than local or temporary significance, to determining whether a written account, drawings or even a model was required as a permanent record. This detailed investigation was referred to one of the Committees established early on in the formation of the Society. There were six principal ones: Agriculture, Chemistry, Polite Arts, Manufactures, Mechanics, and Colonies and Trade. They dealt with the matters speedily – often within a week – and would meet frequently to get the work done. By 1764 the organisation for handling prize entries and awards had almost become an industry in its own right: the offers published that year filled 91 pages of text and comprised 380 classes in which to compete. By 1766 the amount expended on premiums totalled £16,625.

A poem by George Cockings was published in 1769 dedicated to "The Right Honourable the President, Vice Presidents and Members of the Society..." which gives a full and amusing account of the Society and its achievements.

K W Luckhurst, MA – the then secretary to the RSA – described in his 1949 paper the many successes flowing from the awards, including reafforestation and the invention of mechanical devices. Much more recently, however, the economist Zorina Khan has stated that the Society “ultimately became disillusioned with the prize system, which they recognized had done little to promote technological progress and industrialization” and argues that the patent system is more effective.

Prizes

References 

Royal Society of Arts
Organizations established in 1754
Learned societies of the United Kingdom
Organisations based in London with royal patronage
1754 establishments in England